An operator precedence grammar is a kind of grammar for formal languages.

Technically, an operator precedence grammar is a context-free grammar that has the property (among others)
that no production has either an empty right-hand side or two adjacent nonterminals in its
right-hand side. These properties allow precedence relations to be
defined between the terminals of the grammar. A parser that exploits these relations is considerably simpler than more general-purpose parsers such as LALR parsers. Operator-precedence parsers can be constructed for a large class of context-free grammars.

Precedence relations 
Operator precedence grammars rely on the following three precedence relations between the terminals:

These operator precedence relations allow to delimit the handles in the right sentential forms:  marks the left end,  appears in the interior of the handle, and  marks the right end. Contrary to other shift-reduce parsers, all nonterminals are considered equal for the purpose of identifying handles.
The relations do not have the same properties as their un-dotted counterparts;
e. g.  does not generally imply , and  does not follow

Let us assume that between the terminals  and  there is always exactly one precedence relation. Suppose that $ is the end of the string.
If we remove all nonterminals and place the correct precedence relation:

Example 
For example, the following operator precedence relations can
be introduced for simple expressions:

They follow from the following facts:
 + has lower precedence than * (hence  and ).
 Both + and * are left-associative (hence  and ).

The input string
 
after adding end markers and inserting precedence relations becomes

Operator precedence parsing 

Having precedence relations allows to identify handles as follows:

 scan the string from left until seeing 
 scan backwards (from right to left) over any  until seeing 

It is generally not necessary to scan the entire sentential form to find the handle.

Operator precedence parsing algorithm 
The algorithm below is from Aho et al.:
 If $ is on the top of the stack and ip points to $ then return
 else
     Let a be the top terminal on the stack, and b the symbol pointed to by ip
     if a  b or a  b then
         push b onto the stack
         advance ip to the next input symbol
     else if a  b then
         repeat
             pop the stack
     else error()
 end

Precedence functions 

An operator precedence parser usually does not store the precedence table with the relations, which can get rather large. Instead, precedence functions f and g are defined.
They map terminal symbols to integers, and so the precedence relations between the symbols are implemented by numerical comparison:
 must hold if  holds, etc.

Not every table of precedence relations has precedence functions, but in practice for most grammars such functions can be designed.

Algorithm for constructing precedence functions 
The below algorithm is from Aho et al.:
 Create a directed graph whose nodes are the groups.
 If the constructed graph has a cycle then no precedence functions exist.

Example 

Consider the following table (repeated from above):

Using the algorithm leads to the following graph:

     gid
       \
  fid   f*
     \  /
      g*
     /
   f+  
    | \
    |  g+
    |  |
   g$  f$

from which we extract the following precedence functions from the maximum heights in the directed acyclic graph:

{| class="wikitable" 
|-
!
! id
! +
! *
! $
|-
! f
| 4
| 2
| 4
| 0
|-
! g
| 5
| 1
| 3
| 0
|}

Operator-precedence languages

The class of languages described by operator-precedence grammars, i.e., operator-precedence languages, is strictly contained in the class of deterministic context-free languages, and strictly contains visibly pushdown languages.

Operator-precedence languages enjoy many closure properties: union, intersection, complementation, concatenation, and they are the largest known class closed under all these operations and for which the emptiness problem is decidable. Another peculiar feature of operator-precedence languages is their local parsability, that enables efficient parallel parsing.

There are also characterizations based on an equivalent form of automata and monadic second-order logic.

Notes

References

Further reading

External links 
 Nikolay Nikolaev: IS53011A Language Design and Implementation, Course notes for CIS 324, 2010.

Formal languages